Tour of Iran (Azerbaijan) 2016 is the 31st edition of Tour of Iran (Azerbaijan) which is took place between May 13 till May 18, 2016 in Iranian Azerbaijan. The tour had 6 stages and the total length is 1005 km. In 31st stage of the tour 21 teams from four continents participate. For the first time in the history of Tour of Azerbaijan a cycling team from United States, participated in the tournament.

Participant teams

Stages of the Tour

Final standing

External links 
 Videos of 2016 edition of Tour of Iran (Azerbaijan)

References 

Tour of Azerbaijan (Iran)
2016 UCI Asia Tour